Boocame District is a district in the eastern Sool region of Somaliland. Its capital lies at Boocame.

See also
Administrative divisions of Somaliland
Regions of Somaliland
Districts of Somaliland
Somalia–Somaliland border

References

Districts of Somaliland
Sool, Somaliland
Ciid